Bachia heteropa is a species of "microteiid" lizard in the family Gymnophthalmidae. The species is native to the Caribbean and northern South America. There are two recognized subspecies.

Common names
Common names for B. heteropa include La Guaira bachia, LaGuaira bachia, and worm lizard (in English), and falsa vibora común and lagartija lombriz (in Spanish).

Geographic range
The distribution of B. heteropa includes Colombia, Trinidad and Tobago, and Venezuela.

Description
B. heteropa can reach a length of  snout-to-vent, and its tail may be more than 1.5 times that long.  Its limbs are very small relative to its body length.  It has four digits on each forelimb, and two digits on each hindlimb.  Its body is covered by rows of large, overlapping, hexagonal scales.

Habitat

Diet
B. heteropa feeds on arthropods and their larvae.

Reproduction
B. heteropa is oviparous.

Subspecies
Two subspecies of Bachia heteropa are recognized as being valid, including the nominotypical subspecies.
Bachia heteropa heteropa 
Bachia heteropa marcelae 

Nota bene: A trinomial authority in parentheses indicates that the subspecies was originally described in a genus other than Bachia.

References

Further reading

Malhotra, Anita; Thorpe, Roger S. (1999). Reptiles and Amphibians of the Eastern Caribbean. London: Macmillan Education Ltd. . (p. 107).
Schwartz A, Thomas R (1975). A Check-list of West Indian Amphibians and Reptiles. Carnegie Museum of Natural History Special Publication No. 1. Pittsburgh, Pennsylvania: Carnegie Museum of Natural History. 216 pp. (Bachia heteropus, p. 109).
Wiegmann AFA (1856). In: Lichtenstein H, von Martens E (1856). Nomenclator  et amphibiorum Musei Zoologici Berolinensis. Namenverzeichniss der in der zoologischen Sammlung der Königlichen Universität zu Berlin aufgestellten Arten von Reptilien und Amphibien nach ihren Ordnungen, Familien und Gattungen. Berlin: Königliche Akademie der Wissenschaften. iv + 48 pp. (Chalcides heteropus, new species, p. 17). (in German and Latin).

External links
Bachia heteropa at the Encyclopedia of Life.

Reptiles of the Caribbean
Reptiles of Colombia
Reptiles of Venezuela
Bachia
Reptiles described in 1856
Taxa named by Arend Friedrich August Wiegmann